Giannis Theodosoulakis (born 11 September 2004) is a Greek professional footballer who plays as a forward for Super League club OFI.

References

2004 births
Living people
Greek footballers
Super League Greece players
OFI Crete F.C. players
Association football forwards
Footballers from Rethymno